The Reliant Robin is a small three-wheeled car produced by the Reliant Motor Company in Tamworth, England. It was offered in several versions (Mk1, Mk2 and Mk3) over a period of 30 years. It is the second-most popular fibreglass car in history after the Chevrolet Corvette, with Reliant being the second-biggest British car manufacturer for a time.

History

Mk. 1 

The Robin was first manufactured in October 1973 as a direct replacement for the Reliant Regal. These models feature a 750cc engine, but in 1975, the car gained a number of improvements including an engine boost to 850cc. The Reliant Robin was well received in the 1970s because of good work executed by Ogle Design, (who had previously designed the Bond Bug, and Reliant Scimitar) and affordable price, considering  was possible, and orders increased with the 1970s fuel crisis. The final original version of the Robin rolled off the production line in 1982, and after a number of limited editions, including the GBS and the Jubilee, it was replaced by the restyled Reliant Rialto designed by IAD in Worthing, UK. The vehicle was also produced under licence in Greece by MEBEA between 1974 and 1978, and it was manufactured in India by Sunrise Automotive Industries Limited as the "Badal".

Mk. 2 

In 1989, Reliant revived the Robin name, producing a new and totally revamped Robin featuring a new fibreglass body featuring a hatchback, with later an estate and van joining the range. The Rialto continued in production alongside the new Robin until 1998 as purely a cheaper model in saloon, estate and van models also. Later on in production, the Robin received new, 12 inch wheels, improved brakes (from the original mini) and an improved interior with new dials and interior trim. Reliant also started offering an unleaded engine (shown by having a green rocker cover) which features hardened exhaust valve seats. As well as this, the new models joined the range with the LX, SLX, BRG, and Royale models. Royale and BRG models were top of the range and cost over £9,000. New colours such as metallic silver, British racing green, royal blue and nightfire red were used, along with a range of retro-style optional extras such as minilite alloy wheels and jaguar custom seat patterns, which then became available on all Robin models.

Mk. 3 

The Robin received another facelift in 1999, with the design executed by Andy Plumb, chief designer at Reliant at that time. This final version was launched boasting the biggest changes since the original launch, with completely new panels and Vauxhall Corsa front lamps. It was the first Robin to be designed with the use of a computer. An electric and a diesel version along with a pickup variant were conceptualised, but never made. A hatchback van was manufactured.

In 2000, it was announced the final Reliant Robin would be built after 65 limited editions were made. It was named the "Reliant Robin 65"  and had a very high specification. All 65s had gold metallic paint, red and grey leather seats, red carpets, walnut dashboards, white dials, minilite alloy wheels, premium stereo systems, electronic ignitions and gold plaques on the dashboards which were individually numbered and bore the original owner's engraved name. The selling price was £10,000. The last Reliant Robin produced was given away by The Sun newspaper in a Valentine's Day competition in 2001.

BN-1 and BN-2 
Manufacturing of the Robin resumed under licence by B&N Plastics in July 2001. This firm was allowed to produce 250 cars a year, but it was stalled by problems and production faults and went into financial trouble after producing just 40 or so complete cars up to October 2002.

The BN-1 Robin was based on the Robin 65 limited edition, and featured all the expensive extras but with a more modern feature set. The car had a completely redesigned interior, with a new dashboard and interior in black. The body also received some under-the-skin features, including integrated fibreglass skims for the door hinges and a new whole-body fabrication process, which resulted in reduced weight. The revised car was reapproved, so that it was legal for sale in the UK.

The BN-2 Robin was a higher specification model, featuring higher-grade materials for the interior, a custom metallic paint finish, a radio-CD (instead of radio-cassette) and front electric windows, a first for the Robin.

General specifications 
The single wheel in the front is responsible for the steering, while the engine (also in the front) drives the rear axle. The Reliant Robin aimed to provide economical and predictable personal transport. The 850 cc engine gives an acceleration of 0 to 60 mph in 14 seconds and a top speed of 85 mph, they also give a very good economy figure of up to 70 mpg; the later Mk3 Reliant Robin was quoted to give 60 to 100 mpg.

Licence requirements 
Despite its size, by being a three-wheeler with an official mass below , the Robin could traditionally be driven by holders of a B1 category driving licence in the United Kingdom, and registered and taxed at motorcycle rates, which gave a saving of £55 a year over a conventional car. Up until 2001, the B1 licence entitlement was given to those who passed the category A motorcycle test, leading to the common misconception that people could drive a Robin on a motorcycle licence. Those passing their motorcycle test after 2001 could not drive a Robin, until the law changed in December 2012. As of 29 December 2012, tricycles such as the Robin no longer fall within the B1 category licence; in-line with European Union law, tricycles are now classified under the category A "motorcycle licence". As such, any person holding a "full motorcycle licence" may legally drive a Robin. As it was not the licence entitlement that changed, but rather the categorisation of tricycles into an existing category, the change applies to all holders of category A motorcycle licences, whenever they were obtained. Shortly after this an oversight was that a person with a full car licence could no longer drive a three-wheeled vehicle; this was then altered by the UK government after car companies which produce three-wheeled vehicles (such as Morgan) protested over the licensing changes, this resulted in car licence holders now being able to drive a three-wheeled vehicle, but an age limit of 21 was also added; this 21 or over age limit also applies to motorcycle category A licence holders.

Driving a Reliant with a motorcycle licence (United Kingdom regulations) 

Originally, it was possible to drive a three-wheeled Reliant with a motorcycle permit, as a full motorcycle permit included a B1 class endorsement, which gave a driver the right to drive vehicles with three or four wheels of up to 550 kg. However, the  DVLA ceased to issue the B1 endorsement in 2001.

Interest in the Reliant increased once more after January 2013, when the licensing scheme was changed once again. From 2013, a holder of a full category A motorcycle licence over the age of 21 may drive a three-wheeled vehicle of any power. This age restriction applies to full Category B holders also. In a further change in 2014, the UK government created a new descriptor "motor tricycles with power output over 15kW" within the top-level category A (including its related driver age restriction of 21 years), into which the Reliant 3 wheeler range fits.

Because of these licensing changes, a Reliant Robin cannot be driven with a provisional licence; unless the driver meets certain disability criteria.

In popular culture 
Reliant three-wheelers enjoy a special place in British culture, often humorously as the butt of jokes, such as when Patsy Stone dismissively refers to Edina Monsoon's isolation chamber as resembling one in the TV series Absolutely Fabulous.  In the United Kingdom, the Robin is sometimes affectionately nicknamed the "Plastic Pig" because of its distinctive shape and fibreglass body shell. It is also often, and erroneously, referred to as the Robin Reliant. Georgia Nicolson, the fictional heroine of Louise Rennison's Confessions of Georgia Nicolson book series aimed at teenage girls, regularly makes fun of the family car, referred to as a Robin Reliant.

Miss Shepherd owned one Reliant Robin in The Lady in the Van, a 1989 book, 1999 play and 2015 film by Alan Bennett, a real-life portrayal of a case of Diógenes syndrome.

The Reliant Robin is staple material for comedian Jasper Carrott.

Perhaps two of the best known Reliants in British comedy are actually Reliant Regal Supervans—the dirty yellow van owned by the Trotter brothers in Only Fools and Horses, and the light blue van that always ends up getting tipped over, crashed into, bumped out of its parking space etc. by a British Leyland Mini in Mr. Bean.

Reliant Robins make semi-regular appearances on Scrapheap Challenge, often stripped down to a light three-wheeled chassis. One team converted the car into a wheelie-racer.

The 2011 Disney film Cars 2 features a French character named Tomber who is patterned on a Reliant Regal saloon car, though he also has been compared to a Robin. His name means "falling" in French, referencing the instability of three-wheel vehicles.

The 2018 music video for Rick Astley's She Makes Me, from the album Beautiful Life prominently features a yellow Reliant Rialto.

The original American television series Magnum P.I. features a Robin in the season 6 opener from 1985, titled "Deja Vu". Johnathon Quayle Higgins rents and drives one.

In the 2019 Amazon Prime Video series Good Omens Witchhunter Private Newton Pulsifer (played by Jack Whitehall) drives a robin's egg blue Robin.

Top Gear 

On 18 February 2007 episode of Top Gear (series 9, episode 4), a  Reliant Robin was used by Richard Hammond and James May in an attempt to modify a normal K-reg Robin into a reusable Space Shuttle. The booster rockets separated cleanly, but the fuel tank did not detach, and the Robin crashed into the ground. This launch was the "largest non-commercial rocket launch in European history".

In a subsequent episode of Top Gear (series 15, episode 1), a  modified 1994 Reliant Robin was used by Jeremy Clarkson to drive 14 miles from Sheffield to Rotherham. He described driving it as dangerous as "inviting your mum 'round for an evening on chatroulette", and that the Robin "wasn't funny, it was a complete menace". During the segment, Clarkson rolled a specially side-weighted Robin at least six times. The following two episodes featured racing driver The Stig and Ken Block on their test track in Robins, and neither of them could finish a clean lap in the specially doctored Robin. Later on, Clarkson admitted that the Robin used in the show had the differential modified to allow "the poor little thing" to roll over easily. The car also had unequal sized wheels fitted creating an imbalance toward the driver's side.

See also 

 Biotechnia Ellinikon Trikyklon – Greek manufacturer of three-wheeled vehicles
 Liège

References

External links 

 Jeremy Clarkson from Top Gear 'rolls' the Reliant
  Imagine Dragons – On Top of the World
 Reliant Owners Club
3-wheelers Website
Reliant Motor Club

Reliant vehicles
Three-wheeled motor vehicles
Cars introduced in 1973